Carl Rydquist (born 1977 in Göteborg) is a Swedish-American FIA Silver and Trans-Am racing driver and a SAG-AFTRA licensed stunt and precision driver who has won many auto races and racing championships. Rydquist gained notoriety for his speed in 2001 when he beat more than 1100 enthusiasts and professional racedrivers in a gocart challenge created by Eurosport to promote their Super Racing Weekend FIA GT and ETCC sports coverage. The event propelled him to his first GT Endurance ride with Apex Racing's Porsche. Rydquist actively competes in racing and has competed in professional drifting. In Rydquist's auto racing career, he currently has a victory in more than one third of his races and podium finishes in three out of four Touring and GT car endurance and sprint races.

Rydquist won the Zandvoort 500 during the 2005 Dutch Winter Championship making him the first of only three Swedish drivers to ever win this race, following three successful seasons in the Swedish Endurance Racing Cup which earned him two GT-class titles (2001, 2004). This was the starting point of his international racing career in Europe and the USA.

Racing career 
Rydquist began his racing career with sports car club racing in 1996-2000 with his father's Lotus Super Seven Replica. Rydquist gained racing experience and won the Göteborg Sports Car Club racing championship in 2000.

In 2001, Rydquist earned his break into professionally organized racing by qualifying as the fastest driver during a weeklong gocart race (Eurosport Super Racing Weekend Challenge). The qualifying held at the 2001 Göteborg Auto Show saw more than 1100 drivers battling for a spot in the pro finals to compete against professional racing and karting champions. Rydquist's #1 laptime automatically secured a spot in the Top 32 driver roster. Through the bracket of 6-driver heats, Rydquist continued to beat all present professional racedrivers and karting aces, until the final 6-driver heat where Rydquist took 3rd place, with professional racing star Peter Dumbreck and karting racer Fredrik Danielsson in first and second places.

Shortly following the race, Rydquist was invited to test for the professionally operated Swedish GT racing team Apex Racing, a branch of Elgh Motorsport, co-owned and operated by professional racedrivers and Le Mans veterans. The test went successful and Rydquist brought the Apex Racing Porsche 964 RS to a GT-class victory in the 2001 Swedish Endurance Cup season through four 8H and 12H races, claiming 1 pole position and 1 victory in his maiden national GT racing season. Rydquist also took 2nd place in the 2001 Endurance Racing Cup (Touring cars) season finale in a BMW 320i.

2002 and 2003 saw now Champion-sponsored Rydquist visit the one-spec series Swedish Junior Touring Car Challenge with MH Motorsport in a front-wheel driven Volvo S40 JTCC car as well as adding ground-effects experience to his merits when racing in the Scandinavian Sports Racing Car Challenge. Rydquist's laptimes in the JTCC Volvo topped those of his two teammates in his first practice and in his second race weekend he won a podium position after taking 4th in two earlier heats. Rydquist also collected more points during his second weekend in JTCC than both his teammates. Racing a Radical the Scandinavian Sports Racing Car Challenge, Rydquist set faster laptimes than both of his teammates and took a podium finish in his first race weekend in this car type (in his 2nd event Rydquist made an advancement to 8th from 16th starting position stemming from mechanical failure in qualifying). In 2003 Rydquist also qualified an ex-BTCC BMW M3 in 3rd place in a Swedish Endurance Racing Series event.

In 2004, Rydquist was back full-time in the Swedish Endurance Racing Cup with MV Racing's Porsche 993 RSR. Rydquist broke four official class lap records, took two pole positions and won three out of six 3-hour races on the way to winning an overall Swedish 3H Endurance Racing Cup title.

In 2005 the Swedish Endurance Racing series was officially dubbed a National Swedish Endurance Racing Championship. Still sponsored by Champion, Rydquist set off with the win in the premiere 3-hour race of the season, piloting MV Racing's Porsche 911 GT3 Cup. 
During the remainder of the 2005 season Rydquist won twice and set the fastest qualifying laptime of all participating Porsche 911 GT3 Cup cars twice, in the end earning the first runner-up position in the championship standings. Rydquist got invited by Loehr Racing at the end of 2005 to race in the inaugural Zandvoort 500 in the team's Porsche 911 GT3 RS. Supported by professionally operated Levin Racing, Rydquist raced with team-mates Martin Morin and Bernard Loehr and they took the checkered flag first, making Loehr Racing the first Swedish team to ever win this race.

In 2006 Rydquist went to race in one of the world's most challenging races: The 24 Hours of Nurburgring Nordschleife. Rydquist and the Levin Racing team had a firm grip on their class podium until the gearbox mount of their Porsche 996 (3.5 litres) gave way in the middle of the night followed by an on-track contact requiring repairs. The team salvaged a 9th in class finish. Rydquist also set the fastest lap of the race in the Swedish Endurance Racing series season premiere with MV Racing's Porsche 911 GT2 R.

2007-2009 Rydquist followed up with three more 24H races on the Nurburgring Nordschleife with Levin Racing's Porsche 911 GT3 RS. In 2007 the team was top 10 competitive until a team-mate had an on track accident at night. In 2008 Rydquist qualified side by side with Heinz-Harald Frentzen in a Gumpert Apollo but a team-mate's first stint contact with a guardrail turned the race into a catch-up event. In 2009 the team had landed a valuable sponsorship contract with Hankook Tire but their race ended with an engine problem.

In 2010 Rydquist won the Redline Time Attack Championship, a series focused on qualifying setup and driving ability, by 4 victories and 3 podium finishes racing the turbocharged City Tire Online Nissan 350Z. In the process Rydquist set a new track lap record for his class at Willow Springs International Raceway. Rydquist's year of 2010 was rounded off by taking 7th in class in #74 Team MER/Hankook/AE Performance Mazda MX5 Playboy Cup car as professional co-driver to actor Paul "Fast & Furious" Walker in the 25 Hours of Thunderhill.

In 2011, Rydquist won a 2nd-place finish in a one-off visit to the MotoIQ Pacific Tuner Car Championship, again racing the City Tire Online Nissan 350Z. Rydquist led the majority of the race until an electrical glitch during the closing stages of the race nearly forced a retirement, however when the engine finally restarted, Rydquist set the fastest lap of the race and secured 2nd place.

Rydquist celebrated his 5th start in the legendary 24 Hours of Nurburgring Nordschleife race in 2011, racing for German Steam Racing. The team's race ended early when a co-driver had a collision that rendered the team's Porsche 997 GT3 Cup undriveable. The team swung back in September at the 2011 24 Hours of Barcelona, in which Rydquist finished 2nd in the Porsche class and 8th overall.

Upon his return from Barcelona, Rydquist was drafted by Santa Ana-based Berk Technology to set up and race their BMW 135i in the 2011 Eurotuner GP and the 2011 Super Lap Battle finals. Rydquist won the Eurotuner GP roadcourse shootout and he also won the most competitive class of the Super Lap Battle, in the process setting a new class track record.

In 2012 Rydquist and Berk Technology followed up on their success with a first-time-in-history double win and two new class records in Global Time Attack Limited and Street classes on the same day with the same competition vehicle by simply swapping tires on the Berk Technology BMW 135i.

In 2015, following two years of professional drifting in the USA (below), Rydquist returned to sports car racing with German Mercedes-Benz dealer team Motorsport Sing, piloting their SLK 350R in the VLN series at the Nurburgring. A new collaboration with Utah-based CA Sport (Competition Associates) saw his place 5th in class in the 2015 25 Hours of Thunderhill in the team's Nissan 370Z Nismo.

The 25-hour endurance race sparked new opportunities with the CA Sport racing team and Rydquist went on to race the team's #34 Nissan 370Z Nismo Touring Car in the season opener of the 2016 Pirelli World Challenge at Circuit of the Americas. Rydquist captured 3rd in the first race and claimed the fastest lap awarding him the pole position for race two. Although the second race seemed to offer the possibility of another podium finish for Rydquist the #34 car had to be retired at the halfway mark due to an unexpected oil leak.

In addition to the Pirelli World Challenge Touring Car sprint race at Circuit of the Americas, Rydquist joined California-based Prototype Development Group for a full season campaign with their Factory Five Racing GTM in the 2016 National Auto Sport Association Endurance Racing Championship which the team had won three years in a row. At the first race Rydquist qualified on pole position and won overall. It was a 3 hour long race in mixed weather conditions at Willow Springs International Raceway. He followed up with a flag to flag win from pole position also in the second round at Buttonwillow Raceway. Rydquist drove the 3 hour endurance races solo without a co-driver. Rydquist's championship effort was hampered when the rear axle wheel lugs failed in two consecutive races he was leading big at Willow Spring International Raceway, which dropped Rydquist to 4th and 2nd place finishes respectively. Rydquist finished second in the 2016 overall points standings.

Rydquist capped off 2016 with another drive in the 25 Hours of Thunderhill, with the same team and car he had races in the NASA endurance season. Racing with former top 3 finishers Mike Holland, Beau Borders and Troy Lindstrom, Rydquist and the team's main competitors were Flying Lizards Porsche 997 GT3 RSR and Audi R8 GT3 LMS, as well as a Lamborghini Super Trofeo campaigned by CLP Motorsports. Halfway into the race Rydquist and his teammates were running 3rd in the ES (GT) class, however their chances to take a podium finish were eliminated when the front-splitter failed. Later in the race a rear balljoint failure dropped the team out of contention of even a top 10 finish.

Rydquist's 2017 NASA Western Endurance Racing Championship season started off with a gearbox failure that dropped Rydquist from a one lap lead to an early end of his race, which put an immediate dent in his second NASA endurance title attempt. He followed up with back to back wins in the second and third rounds that both took place at Buttonwillow Raceway. With no means to recover enough championship points from the first race retirement the team exited the championship early to focus on winning the United States Touring Car Championship and to prepare for the 2017 25 Hours of Thunderhill.
 
In 2017 Rydquist won the United States Touring Car Championship title, in the Grand Touring (GT) class. This extended the successful collaboration with the Prototype Development Group beyond endurance racing into Sprint Racing. Rydquist raced the team's Factory Five Racing GTM. He took the GT class and overall win at the season opener, a rain race at Laguna Seca. He then went on to claim second place at Auto Club Speedway before winning again both at Sonoma Raceway and at the series' second visit to Laguna Seca.

Rydquist capped a very successful 2017 racing campaign together with the Prototype Development Group and team-mates Mike Holland, Beau Borders and Troy Lindstrom by claiming a 3rd place finish in his class (ES/GT) and 5th overall in the 2017 25 Hours of Thunderhill.

In 2018 Rydquist once again entered the NASA Western Endurance Racing Championship, this time in the ESR class. His first entry of 2018 was with the Prototype Development Group's notorious Factory Five Racing GTM at the 3rd round held at Buttonwillow Raceway. In the 3 hour twilight race he took the lead on the first lap having started in 3rd place. An early puncture dropped him back to 8th but he made his way back to the lead and claimed the overall win of the race. At the 6 Hours of Utah Rydquist claimed the overall pole position and won the class together with team-mates Beau Borders and Mike Holland. In the NASA WERC season finale, the 4 Hours of Sonoma, Rydquist again shared driving duties with Beau Borders. Rydquist started from pole by virtue of having the leading car in the fastest class, handed the car off in the lead to Borders who went on to secure the overall win. The total season points earned Rydquist and the team the 2018 NASA WERC ESR Championship title.

The 2018 25 Hours of Thunderhill marked Rydquist's fifth start in this race. Once again he raced with Mike Holland, Beau Borders and Troy Lindstrom in the Prototype Development Group's #4 Factory Five Racing GTM featuring Hankook Tire as title sponsor. The team challenged the Toyo Tires Flying Lizard Porsche 997 RSR piloted by Wolf Henzler, Johannes van Overbeek, Justin Marks, Charlie Hayes, and Andy Wilzoch for ES class pole and intermittently led the class. Ultimately Rydquist and his team scored a best ever finish for the PDG team claiming 2nd in the ES class and 3rd overall behind the Porsche (ES) and One Motorsports Hankook Tire Radical SR3 (ESR).

In 2019 Rydquist entered two different sprint racing leagues, the SCCA Trans Am Series presented by Pirelli West Coast Championship, and the United States Touring Car Championship. Rydquist's first Trans Am Series appearance was at Sonoma Raceway. Starting from last on the grid as a result of a schedule conflict with his full season USTCC campaign, Rydquist raced through the field to take a commanding SGT class win and a 4th overall finish in the field of TA, TA2, SGT and GT cars. At Circuit of the Americas all Trans Am championships raced together. Rydquist won the West Coast SGT category and finished 4th overall among the National entries. In the USTCC series Rydquist started off with a grand slam, capturing pole position, setting the fastest lap and winning overall in the season opener at Las Vegas Motor Speedway. He also won from pole position at Sonoma Raceway, Laguna Seca and Thunderhill, claiming the USTCC GT Championship title for a second time.

In the 2020 Trans Am Series presented by Pirelli West Coast Championship, Rydquist competed in the SGT category driving the Prototype Development Group's Factory Five Racing GTM. Rydquist won every race the team entered. His most notable achievement was an overall podium finish in a rain race at Sonoma, where he finished third behind Greg Pickett and Thomas Merrill in TA, TA2 category Ford Mustangs. In the same car Rydquist raced to the NASA WERC ES category win in the season opener at Willow Springs International Raceway, co-driving with Beau Borders.

In 2021 Rydquist won the Trans Am presented by Pirelli Series TA2® West Championship. TA2® is recognized world wide as one of the most competitive sprint road racing series in the United States. Rydquist clinched the championship one round early with a win from pole in Utah, following wins at Sonoma, Thunderhill and the Ridge.

Rydquist joined Showtime Motorsports for select races in the 2022 National Trans Am TA2® Championship. At the Sebring season opener the team's brand new #4 car exhibited lack of rear grip along with overheating brakes. Rydquist nursed the car from 25th place to finish 13th. At Laguna Seca Rydquist showed strong practice and qualifying pace but retired early with failed brakes. Rydquist and the Showtime Motorsports team rebounded at Sonoma Raceway with both of the team's TA2 cars #4 and #6 performing at similar pace which led to Rydquist's first top 10 finish in the TA2 National Series. For the Music City Grand Prix race in Nashville, Rydquist raced with Nitro Motorsports. In the team's #80 car he was headed for a new personal best TA2 National finish when bad luck struck and Rydquist spun in the oil of a competitor's broken powersteering, resulting in minor contact with the street circuit's concrete barriers. Rydquist was able to complete the race still on the lead lap after pitting for damage inspection.

Drifting career 
Rydquist became interested in drifting upon moving to California. He practiced with his personal Nissan 350Z before entering the Just Drift series in 2008 with the same car, finishing the season in 8th place. Rydquist earned a sponsorship from City Tire Online and a seat in Formula D, a drifting league recognized as the pinnacle of professional drifting. In 2009 Rydquist entered three FD competition events where he immediately qualified into Top 32 at Long Beach and received one vote for One-More-Time in the Top 32 tandem battle against reigning FD champion Tanner Foust. In Rydquist's second FD event at Road Atlanta, the FD judges requested two tandem battles between Rydquist and drifting veteran Darren MacNamara before deciding which driver to move on to Top 16. By Round 3 in Las Vegas Rydquist the team had improved the car and Rydquist qualified in 7th place with the 2nd highest entry speed of the entire FD field, scoring higher points than no less than four former and current Formula Drift champions Chris Forsberg, Michael Essa, Vaughn Gittin Jr and Tanner Foust.

Rydquist's next opportunity in professional drifting was realized several years later. In 2013 Rydquist entered Formula Drift under his own team name Rydquist Racing with a Nissan 350Z formerly driven by Robbie Nishida. The Nissan 350Z was competitive in 2009 but by 2013 the absence of noticeable performance regulations had seen a tremendous development of the competition vehicles in professional drifting. Supported by Berk Technology Rydquist Racing spent a season on development of the Nissan and by 2014 the car was equipped with a turbocharged Chevy LS2 V8 and now campaigned by professional motorsport shop Road Race Engineering. With the car eventually becoming competitive Rydquist claimed his first professional drifting podium at Round 3 Homestead-Miami Speedway and by doing so he upholds his track record of capturing a podium finish in every class or series of auto racing he has entered, the only exception being the 24 Hours of Nuerburgring.

Rydquist announced on his blog following the 2014 season finale that he would end his Formula Drift campaign to start a new chapter in road racing related projects and to utilize his SAG card to do more stunt driving.

Other Appearances 
Rydquist is a member of the Screen Actors Guild (SAG-AFTRA) as precision and stunt driver, and has been hired to drive in commercial shoots for multiple car manufacturers as well as magazines in Europe and the US. Rydquists phenomenal car control skills and experience in door-to-door racing makes him a sought after talent for film productions involving sensitive high performance and precision car to car shoots (Ultimate Arm, Russian Arm, Pursuit Systems), as well as helicopter and airplane based shoots where safety and timing at speed is crucial.

Rydquist has engaged in and attended several charities such as Grants Wishes, STOP CANCER and Reach Out World Wide.

In 2019 Rydquist was identified at the Nurburgring by car magazines (Auto Motor und Sport, Car and Driver, Road and Track) as one of three drivers along with Andreas Simonsen and Thomas Mutsch on a mission to set an electric vehicle lap record driving Tesla's new performance car named Plaid.

Rydquist raced in the 2020 Trans Am Series presented by Pirelli esports championship which was professionally live broadcast and featured a $20000 prize purse. The sim racing championship involved drivers from all Trans Am categories (TA, TA2, SGT, GT) and championships (National, West Coast). The races saw guest drivers from Indycar, international open wheel racing, sports car racing as well as talent expected to become future Trans Am racing stars. After mixed results in the initial two rounds Rydquist became a regular podium finisher. He clinched 5th place in the championship points standings (1. Josh Hurley, 2. Tyler Kicera 3. Ernie Francis Jr. 4. Edward Sevadjian, 5. Carl Rydquist).

Personal life 
Carl Rydquist grew up in the suburbs of Gothenburg on the Swedish West Coast. He earned a Master's degree in Mechanical Engineering from Chalmers University of Technology. Rydquist has been working as an OEM test engineer and test driver for many car companies and holds a Nürburgring Industry Pool driver permit.

Carl currently resides in California and states gocarting and sports such as running and downhill skiing to be his hobbies of choice in his free time.

Notes

External links 
 Official Carl Rydquist website

1977 births
Living people
Swedish racing drivers
American racing drivers
Trans-Am Series drivers
Sportspeople from Gothenburg